The Middlebury Institute of International Studies at Monterey (MIIS), formerly known as the Monterey Institute of International Studies, is an American graduate school of Middlebury College, a private college in Middlebury, Vermont.

Established in 1955, the school provides instruction on a campus in Monterey, California. The institute offers a wide range of master's programs and certificates in various disciplines such as environmental policy, international policy, language teaching, and translation and interpretation. MIIS has two graduate professional schools known as the Graduate School of Translation, Interpretation, and Language Education (GSTILE) and the Graduate School of International Policy and Management (GSIPM), and several related centers.

History

Founding and expansion
The Middlebury Institute was established in 1955 as the Monterey Institute for Foreign Studies (MIFS). In 1961, the school moved to its current downtown Monterey location, where it has since occupied 19 buildings that house two graduate schools, multiple centers, and numerous special programs. In 1997, the institute became the first professional graduate school in the world to offer a master's degree in International Environmental Policy.

Middlebury connection
In December 2005, Middlebury College and the Monterey Institute signed an affiliation agreement that established a formal relationship between the two institutions. Under that agreement, the Monterey Institute board of trustees was reconstituted to include 13 members, nine of them with Middlebury connections and four former members of the Monterey Institute board. In June 2010, Middlebury formalized its acquisition of the institute, which was formally designated A Graduate School of Middlebury College. The Monterey board of trustees was renamed the board of governors, and subsequently the board of overseers, with ultimate responsibility for the institute residing with the Middlebury Board of Trustees. On January 7, 2015, Middlebury announced that the institute would become known as the Middlebury Institute of International Studies at Monterey. The name change was part of a general rebranding of Middlebury-affiliated institutions.

Academics

Graduate School of Translation, Interpretation, and Language Education
The Graduate School of Translation, Interpretation, and Language Education (GSTILE) trains translators, interpreters (including conference interpreters), localization experts, and language teachers.

GSTILE also offers degrees for language teachers who will teach English to speakers of other languages (TESOL) and teach a foreign language. Certificate programs are additionally offered in these areas as well as Language Program Administration.

Short-term language programs
The Middlebury Institute of International Studies also offers several non-degree programs, including intensive ESL programs year round; summer intensive language programs, custom language services, English for diplomats programs, short term translation and interpretation courses, and international policy certificate programs. The institute is the only school in the Western Hemisphere offering graduate degrees in conference interpretation and in translation and interpretation between English-Chinese, English-Japanese and English-Korean.

Translation and Localization Management Program

History 
A unique academic program at the Middlebury Institute is the Translation and Localization Management (TLM) program. It is the only program in the United States, and one of the few programs in the world, that offers a master's degree in this field. It was launched in 2005, bringing together strengths from the then Translation and Interpretation and International Business Schools. The program is featured among the top localization programs recommended by the Globalization and Localization Association (GALA) and American Translators Association (ATA), and it has been attracting an increasing number of students every year.

Immersive learning programs

Frontier Market Scouts Program
The Middlebury Institute of International Studies, in partnership with Village Capital has founded and developed this program. The FMS program aims to train compassionate and capable young professionals into talent scouts and investment managers to serve as local entrepreneurs and social-minded investors in low-income and weak-capital regions of the world.

Design, Partnering, Management & Innovation Program
DPMI is a leadership certificate in international development project management and social change. Over the intensive 3-week program, participants learn a wide variety of concepts, tools, and technologies for the international development and social change field. DPMI is offered every January in California and Rwanda, and every May/June in Monterey, Washington, D.C., and Kenya. Since 2014, the DPMI Rwanda training has been hosted by Partners in Health (PIH), and integrates the completion of a client project. Since 2015, the DPMI Kenya training has been hosted by Locus the Point of International Development.

Winter practica
During the January term, the Middlebury Institute regularly organizes opportunities for students to gain real world experience and practice their languages of study in-country. The institute has offered programs in Chile, El Salvador, Nepal, the Czech Republic, Rwanda, Cuba, Spain, France, and Peru.

Research centers and initiatives

Center for the Blue Economy 
The Center for the Blue Economy (CBE) is the research center managed by MIIS. CBE was founded in year 2011 and focuses mainly on the research related to ocean and coastal economy. The center also complements the International Environmental Policy program by offering specialization course in Ocean and Coastal Resource Management. The center is working in collaboration with various local and national organizations on a wide range of topics including climate adaptation in coastal areas, governing environmental issues and also finding solution to problems that are affecting Ocean and coastal economies. CBE is home to the National Ocean Economics Program, which compiles, analyzes, and publishes economic data about changes and trends along the U.S. coast and in coastal waters.

CBE also offers summer fellowships to the students to work on a wide range of projects related to ocean and coastal resource management. The Speakers Series (Sustainability Speaker Series and the Marine speaker series) organized by the center is a unique platform where experts working in different fields mainly oceans and coastal issues are invited to deliver lectures. This speaker series is organized every year and is open for students, researchers, faculty and public. The center has its own peer-reviewed journal Journal of Ocean and Coastal Economics (JOCE) also that has published around 57 research articles.

Center on Terrorism, Extremism, and Counterterrorism
Established in 2018, the Center on Terrorism, Extremism, and Counterterrorism (CTEC) conducts in-depth research on terrorism and other forms of extremism. CTEC's initial focus is on three crucial areas: threat finance and sanctions, extremist messaging and terrorist use of the internet, and special operations and countering the threat of terrorism.

James Martin Center for Nonproliferation Studies

The James Martin Center for Nonproliferation Studies (CNS) is an American research center located in Monterey, California. It was founded in 1989 by William Potter, world-renowned expert on nuclear non-proliferation. It is the largest nongovernmental organization in the world dedicated to studying, researching and training specialists in combating the spread of Weapons of Mass Destruction (WMD). Its stated mission is “to train the next generation of nonproliferation specialists.” CNS operates offices in Monterey, Calif., Washington, D.C., and Vienna, Austria. These offices offer a variety of programs.

In 2007 it was renamed from Center for Nonproliferation Studies (CNS) in honor of Dr. James Martin.

Publications
 
CNS publishes The Nonproliferation Review, a journal in which authors coming from different regions and disciplines, discuss the causes and consequences of Nuclear, Chemical, and Biological Weapons as well as the spread of them. Also it focuses on different case studies, reports, and book reviews about many topics: weapon programs, treaties and export controls, terrorism, disarmament, and others. The Review dates from 1994 to the present and it is published in different months of the year.

The Inventory of International Nonproliferation Organizations and Regimes is a website that provides information related to disarmament, nonproliferation of weapons of mass destruction, and arms control. It focuses on treaties, regimes and organizations from different parts of the world that deal with International Security topics.

CNS Analysis and Papers is an online website that provides experts’ analyses of Non-Proliferation, Disarmament and other related topics. Papers are divided according to the regions (Americas, Asia, East Asia, Eurasia/Russia, Europe, Middle East/Africa, South Asia) and they are mostly based on current events.

Additionally, CNS provides the public with Tutorials and Videos where scholars and experts analyze current events related to Non-Proliferation. The NukeTube Nonproliferation Multimedia Library provides the readers with open public online material.

Graduate Initiative in Russian Studies
The Graduate Initiative in Russian Studies (GIRS) is a program that offers its participants opportunities to exchange perspectives with Russian scholars, professionals, and students through its five pillars: The Visiting Experts program, Monterey Summer Symposium on Russia, Awards for Research and Travel to Russia, Russian-English Translation of Public Opinion Polls, and the US-Russia Dialogue Series.

Notable faculty
Jan Knippers Black: a prolific writer and long-time educator in the field of human rights. She sat on the board of Amnesty International USA and has been honored by multiple domestic and international rights organizations for her commitment to advocacy.
Jason Blazakis: professor of practice and director of the Center on Terrorism, Extremism, and Counterterrorism, Blazakis is the former director of the Counterterrorism Finance and Designations Office, Bureau of Counterterrorism, in the U.S. Department of State. 
Avner Cohen: an Israeli-American writer, historian, and professor who is well known for his works on nuclear weapons in the Middle East. He authored the seminal work, Israel and the Bomb, which chronicled the Israeli nuclear program and was published in 1998.
Geoffrey Dabelko: an expert on security and the environment and the director of the Environmental Change and Security Program (ECSP) at the Woodrow Wilson International Center for Scholars in Washington, D.C.
Ferenc Dalnoki-Veress: a nuclear physicist and scientist-in-residence at the James Martin Center for Nonproliferation Studies. Member of the Sudbury Neutrino Observatory (SNO) team whose work was awarded the 2015 Nobel Prize in Physics. 
Beryl Levinger: a former senior official with CARE, Save the Children, Education Development Center, and AFS Intercultural Programs; founder of the Peace Corps Fellows program; co-founder of InterAction; and, co-founder (with Vicky Colbert and Oscar Mogollón) of the internationally acclaimed Escuela Nueva (New School) movement.
Jeffrey Lewis: adjunct professor, director of the East Asia Nonproliferation Program at the James Martin Center for Nonproliferation Studies, and a widely quoted expert on North Korea's nuclear program.
William Potter: expert on nuclear non-proliferation.
Moyara Ruehsen: an economist by trade, a certified anti-money laundering specialist (CAMS), and a certified financial crime specialist (CFCS) who has been teaching courses on international economics, financial crime, and terrorist financing for over seventeen years at the institute.
Elena Sokova: expert on nuclear non-proliferation, former deputy director of the James Martin Center for Nonproliferation Studies (CNS). Sokova is the founder of and current director of the Vienna Center for Disarmament and Non-Proliferation.

William Tell Coleman Library 
The William Tell Coleman Library at the Middlebury Institute of International Studies was opened in 1955. The name of the library is associated with the American pioneer William Tell Coleman, whose family donated money in the early days of the institute. Since opening, the library has been serving as a central research hub for students, faculty, staff, alumni, and the local community. The first librarian at the school was World War II survivor and Polish Jew Eva Schroeder. The library provides access to a broad range of resources such as technology, collaborative and quiet study spaces, books in different languages, and online databases.

Library Technology 
The Middlebury Institute Library provides computers, printers, and scanners as well as an Epson SMART board and a fully equipped video conference room.

Access to Information 
The Institute Library's collection consists of approximately 100,000 print volumes, more than 600 print periodical subscriptions, and 35 daily and weekly newspapers. The library is well known for its extensive collection of specialized dictionaries in fields such as trade, diplomacy, nonproliferation, and translation interpretation studies. More than one-third of the library's collection is in a language other than English. The most significant are Chinese, Japanese, Korean, Russian, Arabic, French, Spanish, German, and Portuguese. It also has a large collection of DVDs and streaming films.

The library subscribes to over 50 online databases and hundreds of online academic journals, including JSTOR, Taylor & Francis, and ScienceDirect. Since Middlebury College in Vermont and Middlebury Institute have been under the same umbrella, MIIS students have priority access to Middlebury College's collection through their Interlibrary Loan service.

Library Activities
Throughout the year, the Middlebury Institute Library offers art exhibits, concerts, writing retreats, and instructional workshops. Every year in April, the library organizes celebration activities for national library week.

Campus life

Nationality
International students make up more than 30 percent of the institute's student body.

Student clubs

BUILD
Beyond yourself in Language Development (BUILD) is a student-run organization that provides free low-level language classes in thirteen languages to the Middlebury Institute of International Studies (MIIS) community. Classes are taught by students enrolled in the TESOL and Teaching Foreign Language programs at MIIS.

Toastmasters International
MIIS Toastmasters is an on-campus chapter of Toastmasters International, a nonprofit educational organization that operates clubs worldwide for the purpose of helping members improve their communication, public speaking, and leadership skills. The club is run by MIIS students, and offers a forum for improving public speaking skills and mastering executive presence. The club is open to members of the Monterey community, and meets weekly.

Sustainable campus
In April 2002, the institute signed the Talloires Declaration, joining more than 600 universities internationally in committing to sustainable practices on campus. The institute aims to achieve carbon neutrality through a variety of practices, including the purchase of carbon offsets to reduce the institute's environmental impact. 
 
The institute's Sustainability Council was established in 2007 and is composed of faculty, staff, and students. The council's goal is to promote and implement campus-wide sustainability projects and initiatives.

In the spring of 2009, the institute's organic garden was established by students, and subsequently became a student-led community organic garden. Current organic garden projects include a worm composting initiative and the introduction of 1,500 ladybugs and 150 praying mantises as natural pest control measures. Two insect houses have been added in an effort to attract local bees.
 
Current Sustainability Council projects include a Climate Action Plan, an annual Greenhouse Gas Emission Audit, a student-run organic garden, and planning for future solar panel and EV charging station installation. In May 2019, the institute hosted what some believe may have been the first 100 percent plant-based graduation reception by a graduate school in the U.S. Institute policy requires that all campus events offer at least 50 percent plant-based food options.

Notable alumni
 José Aybar, president of Richard J. Daley College.
 Anna Cummins, co-founder of 5 Gyres.
 Sam Farr, the U.S. representative for California's 17th congressional district, serving since 1993.
 Elayne Whyte Gomez, Ambassador of Costa Rica to the United Nations.
 Brendan Kyle Hatcher, U.S Diplomat
 Katharine Daniels Kurz: Founder and executive editor on the Women's International Perspective
 Matthew Levin, Ambassador of Canada to Spain and Andorra. He was previously the Ambassador of Canada to Cuba and Colombia.
 Ewandro Magalhaes, chief interpreter, International Telecommunication Union.
 Werner Romero, Fulbright fellow and Ambassador of El Salvador to The United Kingdom. Romero was previously the Ambassador of El Salvador to Israel.
 Daggubati Venkatesh, a popular actor in Telugu film industry.
 Samuel A. Worthington, Fulbright fellow and president and CEO of InterAction.
Natasha Bajema, CEO of Nuclear Spin Cycle, former Senior Fellow at National Defense University, former Research Fellow at the United Nations and fiction author.
 Lora Saalman, vice president of the Asia-Pacific Program at the EastWest Institute, former director of the China and Global Security Program at Stockholm International Peace Research Institute (SIPRI)
 Temie Giwa-Tubosun, founder and CEO of LifeBank; Africa's healthcare supply chain engine.

References

External links
Official website

Buildings and structures in Monterey, California
Educational institutions established in 1955
Graduate schools in the United States
Language schools in the United States
Middlebury College
Schools of international relations in the United States
Universities and colleges in Monterey County, California
1955 establishments in California
Private universities and colleges in California